POU class 3 homeobox 3 is a protein that in humans is encoded by the POU3F3 gene.

Function

This gene encodes a POU-domain containing protein that functions as a transcription factor. The encoded protein recognizes an octamer sequence in the DNA of target genes. This protein may play a role in development of the nervous system. [provided by RefSeq, Apr 2015].

References

Further reading